Mustafa Hassanali (born June 9, 1980) is a Tanzanian fashion designer and doctor.

Hassanali's collections have been shown widely throughout Africa and Italy.  His work features detailed beadwork and embellishments.

His work has been showcased at the Cape Town fashion week, Vukani Fashion Awards in Pretoria, Miss Ethiopia Beauty pageant, Mediterranean Fashion Festival in Sicily, Italy and Uganda and Kenya Fashion Week, as well as signature shows in Tanzania.

References

External links

1980 births
Living people
Tanzanian medical doctors
Tanzanian fashion designers
Tanzanian people of Indian descent